Ronald Blaker (born 15 January 1936) is a Kenyan sailor. He competed in the Flying Dutchman event at the 1960 Summer Olympics.

References

External links
 

1936 births
Living people
Kenyan male sailors (sport)
Olympic sailors of Kenya
Sailors at the 1960 Summer Olympics – Flying Dutchman
Sportspeople from Johannesburg